John Manners, 4th Earl of Rutland (c. 1559 – 24 February 1588) was the son of Henry Manners, 2nd Earl of Rutland, and Lady Margaret Neville, daughter of Ralph Neville, 4th Earl of Westmorland.

Marriage and children
He married Elizabeth Charlton, a daughter of Francis Charlton of Apley Castle, by whom he had ten children:
Lady Bridget Manners (21 Feb 1572 – 10 July 1604) married  Robert Tyrwhitt of Kettleby 1594
Roger Manners, 5th Earl of Rutland (6 October 1576 – 26 June 1612) married Elizabeth Sidney.
Francis Manners, 6th Earl of Rutland (1578 – 17 December 1632) married twice, first to Frances Knyvet, and secondly to Cecily Tufton.
George Manners, 7th Earl of Rutland (1580 – 29 March 1641) married Frances Cary.
Sir Oliver Manners (c. 1582 – 1613)
Lady Frances Manners (22 October 1588 – 1643) married William Willoughby, 3rd Baron Willoughby of Parham
Lady Mary Manners
Lady Elizabeth Manners (died 16 March 1653)
Edward Manners died young
Lady Anne Manners; married Sir George Wharton

References
familysearch.org Accessed June 2, 2007

|-

1550s births
1588 deaths
04
Lord-Lieutenants of Nottinghamshire
16th-century English nobility
17th-century English nobility
Rutland
J